Herb Boyd (born November 1, 1938) is an American journalist, teacher, author, and activist. His articles appear regularly in the New York Amsterdam News. He teaches black studies at the City College of New York and the College of New Rochelle.

Biography
Boyd was born in Birmingham, Alabama, and grew up in Detroit, Michigan. He met Malcolm X in 1958 and credits him as an inspiration: "[Malcolm] set me on the path to become the writer-activist I am, to try to live up to the very ennobling things that he represented."

Boyd attended Wayne State University, graduating with a BA in philosophy. During the late 1960s, he helped establish the first black studies classes there and went on to teach at the university for 12 years. He also co-developed and instructed the initial curriculum in jazz studies at the Oberlin Conservatory.

In addition to the Amsterdam News, Boyd's work has been published in The Black Scholar, The City Sun, Down Beat, Emerge, and Essence. He has been recognized with awards from the National Association of Black Journalists and the New York Association of Black Journalists. In 2014, the National Association of Black Journalists inducted Boyd into its Hall of Fame.

Brotherman, which Boyd co-edited with Robert L. Allen, was given the 1995 American Book Award. His biography Baldwin's Harlem was nominated for an NAACP Image Award in 2009.

Boyd was managing editor of The Black World Today, a now-defunct online news service.

In 2018, Boyd was honored with the Outstanding Career Achievement Award at the James Aronson Social Justice Journalism Awards at Hunter College. Boyd credited his wife, writer and professor Elza Dinwiddie-Boyd, for editing his published books.

Selected works
African History for Beginners, For Beginners, 2007. 
Autobiography of a People: Three Centuries of African-American History Told by Those Who Lived It (editor), Anchor Books, 2000. 
Baldwin's Harlem: A Biography of James Baldwin, Atria, 2008. 
Black Detroit: A People's History of Self-Determination, Amistad, 2017 
Brotherman: The Odyssey of Black Men in America (co-editor with Robert L. Allen), One World/Ballantine, 1995. 
By Any Means Necessary: Malcolm X: Real, Not Reinvented (co-editor with Ron Daniels, Maulana Karenga, and Haki R. Madhubuti), Third World Press, 2012. 
We Shall Overcome: The History of the Civil Rights Movement as It Happened, Sourcebooks, 2004.

References

External links
 "NABJ 2014 Hall of Fame Inductee – HERB BOYD". YouTube video.

1938 births
Living people
African-American activists
African-American academics
African-American journalists
African-American writers
City College of New York faculty
College of New Rochelle faculty
Wayne State University alumni
20th-century American journalists
American male journalists
American Book Award winners